Italy sent a delegation to compete at the 1972 Summer Paralympics in Heidelberg, West Germany. They sent twenty five competitors, twenty male and five female.

Medalists

References

External links
Media Guide Tokyo 2020 

Nations at the 1972 Summer Paralympics
1972
Parlympics